Neville Alfred Mitchell (22 November 1913 – 21 May 1981) was a New Zealand rugby union player and coach. A three-quarter, Mitchell represented Southland and Otago at a provincial level, and was a member of the New Zealand national side, the All Blacks, from 1935 to 1938. He played 32 matches for the All Blacks including eight internationals, and captained the side on their 1938 tour of Australia. He later coached the South Canterbury representative team in 1950 and 1951.

References

1913 births
1981 deaths
Rugby union players from Invercargill
People educated at Southland Boys' High School
New Zealand rugby union players
New Zealand international rugby union players
Southland rugby union players
Otago rugby union players
Rugby union centres
Rugby union wings
New Zealand rugby union coaches